Rillettes (also) is a preservation method similar to confit where meat is seasoned then slow cooked submerged in fat and cooked at an extremely slow rate for several hours (4 to 10 hours). The meat is shredded and packed into sterile containers covered in fat. Rillettes are most commonly made with pork, but also made with other meats such as goose, duck, chicken, game birds, rabbit and sometimes with fish such as anchovies, tuna, pike or salmon. Rillettes are best served at room temperature spread thickly on toasted bread. 

Sarthe (Le Mans), Tours, and Anjou, all in central France, are notable sources of rillettes.

The term rillette can refer to the final product and its appearance when spread on sliced bread. Rillettes were traditionally made with fatty pork belly or pork shoulder. The meat was cubed, salted and cured, cooked slowly over low heat until very tender, then raked into small shreds and blended with the warm cooking fat to form a rustic paste. Rillettes could be stored in crocks for several months. In Anjou,  rillaud was a speciality, plated in the shape of a pyramid and topped with the pig's tail; the rillettes were proudly displayed to the guest of honor. In time the rillette cooking style was applied to game birds, wild rabbit, and fish. Eventually several preparations for seafood rillettes were developed including an anchovy, tuna, and salmon version. Though the fish is not actually cooked in the fat, it is blended with fat to form the characteristic paste-spread. The soft, smooth texture is a deciding factor in determining a good rillette dish.

Like cassoulet or fondue, this French dish has its many regional definitions. In general most rillettes are served at room temperature, as a spread with toast points, much like a pâté. Pork rillettes from the northwestern regions of Tours and Anjou are famous for the rich texture and bronze color achieved during the cooking process. Rabelais called rillettes "brown pig jam" (brune confiture de cochon). Rillettes from the adjacent département of Sarthe are distinguished by a more rustic texture, complete with larger pieces of pork and less color.

In Quebec, cretons are similar to rillettes.

Etymology

The French word rillettes is first evidenced in 1845. It derives from the Old French rille, meaning a slice of pork, which is first attested in 1480. This is a dialect variation of the Old French reille, meaning a lath or strip of wood, from the  Latin regula.

See also

 List of cooking techniques
 List of spreads
 Pemmican

References

Lunch meat
Spreads (food)
French cuisine
Culinary terminology